This list of the tallest buildings and structures in Portsmouth ranks skyscrapers and structures in Portsmouth, England by height.

Tallest buildings and structures
An equal sign (=) following a rank indicates the same height between two or more buildings.

Tallest under construction, approved and proposed

Under Construction

Approved

Proposed

Timeline of tallest buildings and structures
The history of tall buildings in Portsmouth only really began in the 1960s and 1970s. The 170m Spinnaker Tower has been the tallest structure in the city since 2005.

References

Portsmouth
Tallest